Alenka Novak (born 17 August 1977) is a Slovenian racing cyclist. A competitor in the 2013 UCI women's time trial in Florence, Novak finished on the podium at the Slovenian National Time Trial Championships on five occasions, with a best finish of second in 2016.

References

External links

1977 births
Living people
Slovenian female cyclists
Place of birth missing (living people)